"I'm Gonna Tear Your Playhouse Down" is a song written by Memphis-based songwriter Earl Randle, and first recorded in 1972 by soul singer Ann Peebles.  The song was also a hit in 1984 for English singer Paul Young.

Ann Peebles version
Produced by Willie Mitchell and with performances by the Hi Rhythm Section, Ann Peebles' recording was made at the Royal Studios on South Lauderdale Avenue in Memphis.  It was issued as a single on the Hi label in January 1973. It reached no.31 on the US R&B chart,  and "bubbled under" the Hot 100, reaching no.111.  The track was also included on her 1974 album I Can't Stand the Rain.

Writer Craig Werner said:Like the most powerful gospel soul from the early sixties, "I'm Gonna Tear Your Playhouse Down" serves notice on a cheating lover (white America?  the brothers in the Black Panther movement?) that the free ride has come to an end. It's a restatement of the revolutionary gospel anthem "Samson and Delilah," and the message, on every level, is the same: "If I had my way, I would tear this building down."

Later versions
 The song was later recorded by Graham Parker and the Rumour on their 1977 album Stick to Me.
 A cover version by Paul Young reached no. 9 on the UK singles chart in 1984, and no.13 on the Billboard Hot 100 when re-released the following year.  It was included on Young's album The Secret of Association (1985).

Samples
 The Ann Peebles' version of "I'm Gonna Tear Your Playhouse Down" was sampled in the track "The Plan" by Wu-Tang Clan affiliated group Sunz of Man on their album The Last Shall Be First (1998).

Charts
Ann Peebles

Paul Young

References

1972 songs
1973 singles
1984 singles
Paul Young songs
Graham Parker songs
Song recordings produced by Willie Mitchell (musician)
Hi Records singles
Columbia Records singles